The OMD Singles is a singles compilation album by Orchestral Manoeuvres in the Dark, released in 1998. It reached number 16 on the UK Albums Chart. Originally, the compilation was to include a second disc of new remixes; however, this idea was abandoned due to budget limitations. The few remixes that were produced were released separately as The OMD Remixes. In 2003, The OMD Singles was reissued in France with the remix disc finally included, comprising the 1998 remixes as well as additional remixes. In the same year Virgin also released a two-disc box set comprising The OMD Singles and Navigation: The OMD B-Sides.

Reception

Tom Schulte of AllMusic wrote, "Originating in post-punk synth experimentation and closing in dated, but still strong, pop productions, The OMD Singles is an excellent time line of the band whose sound covered in a single career that same territory explored by the Human League, Erasure, [Yazoo], New Order, and beyond." In the Press & Sun-Bulletin, Andy Stevens said, "What is most stunning about this compilation is that is displays the incredible emotional, rhythmic and stylistic range that Orchestral Manoeuvres in the Dark drew out of electronics... this collection is near brilliant." Paul Evans of Rolling Stone referred to the album as "radio music made in heaven".

Track listing

Single disc issue 
 CD: Virgin / CDV 2859 (UK)
 MiniDisc: Virgin / MDV2859 (UK)
 Compact Cassette: Virgin / TCV2859 (UK)

 "Electricity" – 3:32 from Orchestral Manoeuvres in the Dark
 "Messages" – 4:46 from Orchestral Manoeuvres in the Dark
 "Enola Gay" – 3:32 from Organisation
 "Souvenir" – 3:37 from Architecture & Morality
 "Joan of Arc" – 3:47 from Architecture & Morality
 "Maid of Orleans" – 4:12 from Architecture & Morality
 "Tesla Girls" – 3:34 from Junk Culture
 "Locomotion" – 3:57 from Junk Culture
 "Talking Loud and Clear" – 3:56 from Junk Culture
 "So in Love" – 3:30 from Crush
 "If You Leave" – 4:30 from Pretty in Pink
 "(Forever) Live and Die" – 3:36 from The Pacific Age
 "Dreaming" – 3:58 from The Best of OMD
 "Sailing on the Seven Seas" – 3:45 from Sugar Tax
 "Pandora's Box" – 4:06 from Sugar Tax
 "Call My Name" – 4:15 from Sugar Tax
 "Dream of Me" – 3:53 from Liberator
 "Walking on the Milky Way" – 4:02 from Universal

Another version of 18 songs has 'Call My Name' (track 16) omitted and 'Enola Gay - OMD vs Sash!' included (track 18)

French issue with remix disc 
 CD: Virgin / 724358285925 (France, 2003)

Disc one 
 "Electricity" – 3:32
 "Messages" – 4:46
 "Enola Gay" – 3:32
 "Souvenir" – 3:37
 "Joan of Arc" – 3:47
 "Maid of Orleans" – 4:12
 "Tesla Girls" – 3:34
 "Locomotion" – 3:57
 "Talking Loud and Clear" – 3:56
 "So in Love" – 3:30
 "If You Leave" – 4:30
 "(Forever) Live and Die" – 3:36
 "Dreaming" – 3:58
 "Sailing on the Seven Seas" – 3:45
 "Pandora's Box" – 4:06
 "Call My Name" – 4:15
 "Dream of Me" – 3:53
 "Walking on the Milky Way" – 4:02

Disc two 
 "Enola Gay" (remix by David Guetta & Joachim Garraud) – 3:05
 "Enola Gay" (OMD vs. Sash!) – 5:03
 "Souvenir" (7am version) – 6:47
 "Souvenir" (Me & Us remix) – 11:32
 "Souvenir" (Hard House version) – 5:47
 "Souvenir" (Moby remix) – 4:41
 "Electricity" (The Micronauts remix) – 8:45
 "Apollo XI" (@440 Northern Electronic Soul remix) – 6:15
 "Joan of Arc" (Organ mix by Mulu) – 6:12
 "Maid of Orleans" (Afterhours mix by Mulu) – 6:12
 "Enola Gay" (Dancefloor Killa remix by David Guetta & Joachim Garraud) – 9:02

 Track 2 is the full unedited version of the Sash! remix, excluding the vocal samples.
 Tracks 9 and 10 were reversed on the album packaging, correct positions are listed here.

The OMD Remixes

The OMD Remixes were released two weeks before The OMD Singles compilation album. The highest UK singles chart position was number 35.

Reception

David Jeffries of AllMusic wrote, "Sash! turns 'Enola Gay' into a pumping trance anthem, but the inserted news broadcasts are misguided, and hardly what you'd call respectful. Moby lightly updates 'Souvenir', but the Micronauts end up the winner doing a fine job of turning 'Electricity' into a noisy stomper."

Track listing

CD: Virgin / VSCDT 1694 (UK) 
 "Enola Gay" (OMD vs. Sash! radio edit) – 4:04
 "Souvenir" (Moby remix) – 4:41
 "Electricity" (The Micronauts remix) – 8:44

12": Virgin / VST 1694 (UK) 
Side one
 "Enola Gay" (OMD vs. Sash!) – 5:18
 "Souvenir" (7am version) – 6:47
Side two
 "Souvenir" (Hard House version) – 5:47

12": Virgin / VSTX 1694 (UK) 
Side one
 "Electricity" (The Micronauts remix) – 8:45
Side two
 "Apollo XI" (@440 Northern Electronic Soul remix) – 6:15
 "Enola Gay" (OMD vs Sash! Radio Edit) – 4:04

Promo CD: Virgin / VSCDJ1694 (UK)
 "Enola Gay" (OMD vs Sash!) – 4:08
 "Souvenir" (Moby Remix) – 4:40
 "Electricity" (The Micronauts Remix Edit) – 4:03

Promo double 12": Virgin / VSTDJ 1694 (UK)
Side one
 "Enola Gay" (OMD Vs Sash!) – 6:11
 "Souvenir" (7AM Version) – 6:47
Side two
 "Souvenir" (Me & Us Mix) – 11:34
 "Souvenir" (Hard House Version) – 5:47
Side three
 "Electricity" (The Micronauts Remix) – 8:44
Side four
 "Apollo XI" (@440 Northern Electronic Soul Remix) – 6:15

 The "Enola Gay" mix sampled news broadcasts announcing the atomic bombing of Hiroshima, as well as the J. Robert Oppenheimer quote, "Now I am become death, destroyer of worlds."
 The "Electricity" mix sampled the song "Bunker Soldiers" from OMD's self-titled debut album.

References

External links
 Album lyrics

1998 greatest hits albums
Orchestral Manoeuvres in the Dark albums
1998 EPs
1998 remix albums
Remix EPs
Virgin Records remix albums
Virgin Records compilation albums
Virgin Records EPs